Colette Fanara (born 15 February 1926) is a French former artistic gymnast. She competed at the 1952 Summer Olympics.

References

External links
 

1926 births
Possibly living people
French female artistic gymnasts
Gymnasts at the 1952 Summer Olympics
Olympic gymnasts of France